Eufaula is an album by Southern rock band Atlanta Rhythm Section, released in 1999.

Track listing
"I'm Not the Only One" (Buie, Hammond) – 5:13
"Who You Gonna Run To" (Buie, Cobb, Nix) – 3:26
"Dreamy Alabama" (Buie, Cobb, Hammond) – 4:35
"Nothing's as Bad as It Seems" (Buie, Cobb, Hammond) – 3:22
"When" (Buie, Daughtry) – 4:39
"You Ain't Seen Nothing Yet" (Buie, Cobb, McKibben) – 4:21
"Fine Day (The Day You Come Back to Me)" (Buie, Cobb, Hammond) – 4:46
"What Happened to Us" (Buie, Hammond) – 3:49
"Unique" (Buie, Cobb, Hammond) – 3:29
"How Can You Do This?" (Buie, Cobb, Hammond) – 4:11
"What's Up Wid Dat?" (Buie, Daughtry, Hammond, Stone) – 3:07

Personnel
Barry Bailey - guitar
Dean Daughtry - keyboards
Ronnie Hammond - vocals, background vocals
Robert White Johnson - background vocals
Steve Nathan - strings, Hammond organ
Justin Senker - bass
Steve Stone - guitar
R. J. Vealey - percussion, drums

Production
Producers: Buddy Buie, Rodney Mills
Engineer: Rodney Mills
Assistant engineers: John Nielsen, Jason Stokes
Mastering: Rodney Mills
Design: Scott Larsen
Photography: Buddy Buie, Rick Diamond, Terry Spackman, Tony Darrigan

References

1999 albums
Atlanta Rhythm Section albums
Albums produced by Rodney Mills
Albums produced by Buddy Buie